The 2012–13 Biathlon World Cup – Individual Men started at Wednesday November 28, 2012 in Östersund and will finish in Sochi. Defending titlist is Simon Fourcade of France.

Competition format
The 20 kilometres (12 mi) individual race is the oldest biathlon event; the distance is skied over five laps. The biathlete shoots four times at any shooting lane, in the order of prone, standing, prone, standing, totalling 20 targets. For each missed target a fixed penalty time, usually one minute, is added to the skiing time of the biathlete. Competitors' starts are staggered, normally by 30 seconds.

2011-12 Top 3 Standings

Medal winners

Standings

References

- Individual Men, 2012-13 Biathlon World Cup